Polenta is a dish of boiled cornmeal that was historically made from other grains. The dish comes from Italy. It may be served as a hot porridge, or it may be allowed to cool and solidify into a loaf that can be baked, fried, or grilled.

The variety of cereal used is usually yellow maize, but often buckwheat, white maize, or mixtures thereof may be used. Coarse grinds make a firm, coarse polenta; finer grinds make a soft, creamy polenta. Polenta is a staple of Northern Italian, Swiss and Balkan (where it is called kačamak or žganci) cuisines (and, to a lesser extent, the Central Italian one, e.g. Tuscany) and its consumption was traditionally associated with lower classes, as in times past cornmeal mush was an essential food in their everyday nutrition.

Etymology

History
As it is known today, polenta derives from earlier forms of grain mush (known as puls or pulmentum in Latin) that were commonly eaten since Roman times. Before the introduction of corn (maize) from America in the 16th century, polenta was made from starchy ingredients like farro, chestnut flour, millet, spelt, and chickpeas.

Cooking time
Polenta takes a long time to cook, simmering in four to five times its volume of watery liquid for about 45 minutes with near-constant stirring; this is necessary for even gelatinization of the starch. Some alternative cooking techniques have been invented to speed up the process or not require constant supervision. Quick-cooking (pre-cooked, instant) polenta is widely used and is prepared in just a few minutes; it is considered inferior to polenta made from unprocessed cornmeal and is best eaten after being baked or fried.

In his book Heat, Bill Buford talks about his experiences as a line cook in Mario Batali's Italian restaurant Babbo. Buford details the differences in taste between instant polenta and slow-cooked polenta and describes a method of preparation that takes up to three hours but does not require constant stirring: "polenta, for most of its cooking, is left unattended. ... If you don't have to stir it all the time, you can cook it for hours—what does it matter, as long as you're nearby?" Cook's Illustrated magazine has described a method using a microwave oven that reduces cooking time to 12 minutes and requires only a single stirring. In March 2010, it presented a stovetop, near-stir-less method that uses a pinch of baking soda (an alkali), which replicates the traditional effect. Kyle Phillips suggested making it in a polenta maker or slow cooker.

In culture

See also

 Ga'at
 Grits
 Farina (food)
 Hasty pudding
 List of maize dishes
 List of porridges
 Mămăligă
 Masa
 Tamales
 Pastel de choclo
 Mush
 Nshima
 Pap
 Pudding corn
 Sadza
 Ugali
 Upma
 Žganci
 Kačamak

References

Further reading
 Brandolini, Giorgio V., Storia e gastronomia del mais e della patata nella Bergamasca, Orizzonte Terra, Bergamo, 2007. 32 pages.
 Eynard, W., La Cucina Valdese, Claudiana, 2006.

Italian cuisine
Italian inventions
Maize dishes
Porridges
Albanian cuisine
Argentine cuisine
Aromanian cuisine
Brazilian cuisine
Bulgarian cuisine
Croatian cuisine
Macedonian cuisine
Montenegrin cuisine
Serbian cuisine
Slovenian cuisine
Somali cuisine
Swiss cuisine
Turkish cuisine
Uruguayan cuisine
Venezuelan cuisine
National dishes
Romani cuisine
Romanian cuisine